Laash (The dead body) is a low budget Hindi horror film directed and produced by K. Mansukhlal. This film was released on 6 February 1998 under the banner of Sonal films.

Plot
There was a haunted house in which there stays a ghost of a woman who kills everybody who tries to stay in that house.

Cast
 Lalita Pawar
 Shakti Kapoor
 Rakesh Bedi
 Yunus Parvez
 Sonika Gill
 Rajinder Nath
 Chandni Gupta
 Kirti Rawal
 Raja Duggal
 Asha Sharma

References

1998 films
1990s Hindi-language films
Indian horror films
1998 horror films
Hindi-language horror films
Indian rape and revenge films

External links